The Shelby Monaco King Cobra, also known simply as the Shelby King Cobra, is a specially modified series of purpose-built sports racing cars, that competed in both the United States Road Racing Championship and the Can-Am series, between 1963 and 1967. It dominated and won the championship three consecutive years in a row (1963, 1964, 1965).

References

Sports racing cars
1960s cars
Cars of the United States
Can-Am cars